"I Just Wasn't Made for These Times" is a song by American rock band the Beach Boys from their 1966 album Pet Sounds. Written by Brian Wilson and Tony Asher, the lyrics describe the disillusionment of someone who struggles to fit into society. Musically, it is distinguished for its melodic bass guitar, layered vocals, and Electro-Theremin solo, marking the first time the instrument was used in popular music and the first time theremin-like sounds were used on a rock record.

One of the last tracks completed for Pet Sounds, Wilson produced the recording with the aid of 14 studio musicians—including Electro-Theremin inventor Paul Tanner—who variously played percussion, basses, guitars, clarinets, piccolo, harpsichord, tack piano, and bass harmonica. All six Beach Boys sang on the track. In addition to multiple vocal counterpoints, the chorus features Spanish-sung backing vocals: "Oh, ¿cuándo seré? Un día seré" ("When will I be? One day I will be").

"I Just Wasn't Made for These Times" remains one of the Beach Boys' most favored songs among fans, and a song closely identified with Wilson's personal life. In 1995, it provided the title of Don Was' documentary of Wilson's life, and in turn, the title of the film's soundtrack (also Wilson's second solo album). In 1996, to promote the upcoming release of The Pet Sounds Sessions, the first true stereo mix of the song was released as a single on the alternative rock label Sub Pop. Artists who have covered the song include Carmen McRae, Peggy Lipton, and Sixpence None the Richer.

Background and lyrics

"I Just Wasn't Made for These Times" was written by Brian Wilson and Tony Asher for the Beach Boys' Pet Sounds album in early 1966. Although Wilson claimed that Asher only provided the words to his music, Asher credited himself with contributing musical ideas to at least three songs on the album, including this one. Asher felt that the writing was different from their other collaborations: "In many of the other songs, when Brian would express a feeling, I would say, ‘Oh, yes, I’ve had those feelings, maybe not in the same way or the same degree, but I understood them. But this one I didn't relate to.” On another occasion, he stated the song evolved from a discussion he had with Wilson about the fact that "[n]either one of us was a particularly popular kid" in high school.

The lyrics describes someone who is depressed and unsure of their place in society, where they can express themselves, who they can trust, and why "good" things that they have "going for myself" always collapse. Whether the character feels he is before or ahead of his time is left ambiguous. In critic Donald A. Guercio's interpretation: "The lyrics are a first-person chronicle of disillusionment from a narrator who, despite being intelligent, can't find a place where he can comfortably feel like a part of the world." Music historian Charles Granata read the song as a "plaintive ballad about coming to terms with one's differences .. Ultimately, the answer to his question—'Where do I fit in?'—lies in the realization that he doesn't."

Asked about the song in a 1976 interview, Wilson stated, "That song reflects my life. It's about a guy who was crying because he thought he was too advanced, and that he'd eventually have to leave people behind." When the interviewer suggested that Wilson appeared to share the character's experiences, he responded, "Yes, it did happen to me. I did Pet Sounds and all my friends thought I was crazy to do it."  Asher stated, "It was definitely a lyric written from Brian's perspective, although during the hours we spent writing, we didn't talk about his socialization per se. He never asked me to interpret his feelings in one of our songs, and certainly not this one."

Granata described it as "[p]erhaps the most sensitive, moving song on Pet Sounds", projecting "an overwhelming sense that the lyric represents Brian's life, his view of himself and his music."  Academic Christopher Kirkey called it "arguably the most personalized and introspective track on Pet Sounds. Conversely, Lorren Daro, a former acquaintance of Wilson's, wrote in a 2012 blog post that he was the actual subject of the song. He disputed the suggestion that the song was about Wilson and argued, "Just reading the lyrics will explode that myth. ... 'Not made for these times'? 'What goes wrong'? It makes no sense."

Composition

"I Just Wasn't Made for These Times" is in the key of B major. The chord progression for the first four bars of the song is ii11 – I9 – VII(911) – vi11 – V(add6). According to musicologist Philip Lambert, "We sense the unease right away, when the song begins on an unstable chord on step 2 of the scale. He states that as the bassline descends from the intervals 2 to 7, it supports "complex harmonies that alternately suggest both stacked upper thirds and suspended or decorative tones."

The electric bass guitar is used as a lead instrument, playing melodically beneath the vocals. In the verses, it plays eighth notes in a register that was rare for pop bass of the era. Musician Amadeo Ciminnsi explained, "Most bass lines of the day employed simple foundational rhythms and root notes to outline the harmony and drive the rhythm section. Brian departs from this by including a more involved rhythm in the verse—and using non-chord tones in the bass line."  Carol Kaye commented,

A honky-tonk-style piano part, played by keyboardist Don Randi, occurs during the chorus, although mixed very low in the recording. It is substantially more audible in the stereo mix of the track created for The Pet Sounds Sessions (1996).

According to Lambert, the strongest musical indication of Wilson's "innovative vision" for the album is heard in the cumulative vocal layering in the chorus, with each line sung by Wilson via overdubs. Wilson sings, "Sometimes I feel very sad", "Ain't found the right thing I can put my heart and soul into", and "People I know don't wanna be where I'm at". Lambert called this "one of the most extreme examples of Wilson's 'opera'-style layering, with each part projecting its own distinct personality." Following the last chorus, the melody is doubled in fourths by a clarinet and bass clarinet, the latter doubled an octave higher by Electro-Theremin.

Recording and Electro-Theremin

Wilson produced the backing track (logged on the AFM contract as "I Just Wasn't Made for These Things") on February 14, 1966. Wilson hired session musician Paul Tanner to play Electro-Theremin (an instrument he invented) possibly with the mistaken assumption that he was using a real theremin for the song's recording. According to Tanner, "Brian phoned and spoke to my wife. I was on a record date, but she knew that the person I was playing for had never heard of overtime!" The occasion marked the first time the Electro-Theremin was used in popular music and the first time theremin-like sounds were used on a rock record.

Granata identified the Electro-Theremin as the "strangest" instrument used on the album. In a 1996 interview, Wilson said that he had been frightened by the "witchy, bewitching sounds" of a theremin as a child, and could not remember "how the heck I ever arrived at the place where I'd want to get one--but we got it."  At that time, theremins were most often associated with the 1945 Alfred Hitchcock film Spellbound, but their most common presence was in the theme music for the television sitcom My Favorite Martian, which ran from 1963 to 1966. Engineer Chuck Britz surmised, "He just walked in and said, 'I have this new sound for you.' I think he must have heard the sound somewhere and loved it, and built a song around it." Biographer John Tobler states that Wilson thought of the instrument after having "watched a Bette Davis horror film".

A total of 14 musicians played on the instrumental recording.  The session was unusual for Tanner, as he recalled, Wilson forwent notation and instead sung Tanner's part for him to play.  Wilson initially attempted to record at Western Studio, but ran out of studio time, and immediately moved to Gold Star.  Take 6 of the orchestra's performance was marked as "best", after which the session was concluded with the recording of Wilson's lead vocal.  Group vocal overdubs for "I Just Wasn't Made for These Times" followed on March 10 and April 13 at Columbia Studio and involved all six Beach Boys.

Critical reception

On May 16, 1966, "I Just Wasn't Made for These Times" was released as the 11th track on Pet Sounds. In his self-described "unbiased" review of the album for Record Mirror, Norman Jopling described the song as "a nostalgic ballad, with sympathetic lyrics and a clever sense of development. But it's somehow depressing, which was probably the intention. Builds up all the time with slight hints of falsetto." The Who frontman Pete Townshend told Melody Maker that the album was "too remote" and "written for a feminine audience ... sympathetic to Brian Wilson's personal problems." Townshend explained, "You've just got to listen to the words, like 'I'm searching for places where new things can be found but people just put me down .' It seems that Brian has left the Beach Boys to be a record producer."

Retrospectively, AllMusic reviewer Donald Gearisco lauded the song as "one of the most moving and powerful tracks in the Beach Boys catalog". He said that the recording features "overwhelming emotion and lush musical textures", while the lyrics were relatable for "anyone who has ever felt 'lost in the crowd'". Writing his book Strange Sounds: Offbeat Instruments and Sonic Experiments in Pop (2005), Mark Brend praised Tanner's solo, saying that it "demonstrates perfectly the electro-theremin's appeal. The pitching is accurate to a degree that only the very best 'real' thereminists' could ever achieve, yet the tone retains the Theremin's haunting ethereal quality – somehow both human-sounding and alien at the same time."

In 2016, the staff of Treblezine ranked "I Just Wasn't Made for These Times" number 3 in their list of the finest songs of the counterculture era, calling it "both a mild rebuke to the temporal world Wilson endured and an intense wish to belong to it. And in an example of delayed poetic justice, it's one of the Beach Boys' most timeless songs."

Sub Pop single
On June 4, 1996, Sub Pop released a stereo mix of "I Just Wasn't Made for These Times" as a single with a vocal only version of "Wouldn't It Be Nice" and with the stereo backing to "Here Today" as the B-side. It was an unusual release for the label, which had traditionally issued records by alternative rock groups such as Nirvana and Soundgarden. 15,000 copies of the single were pressed.

According to label co-owner Jonathan Poneman,   they had been approached by Capitol to issue the single, "knowing that [we had] some Beach Boys enthusiasts", to help promote the upcoming Pet Sounds Sessions box set. He said, "We made it look like our original Singles Club singles with the black bar [at the top], so there's a little bit of humor there if you think back [to our older acts]: Flaming Lips, Mudhoney, and now the Beach Boys."

Legacy

"I Just Wasn't Made for These Times" remains one of the Beach Boys' most favored songs among fans. Biographer Mark Dillon said that it had "become something of a life statement [for Wilson]", while biographer Peter Ames Carlin referred to the song as "the overture for a decades-long saga that would be, in its way, as influential as Pet Sounds had been ... Ultimately, Brian's public suffering had transformed him from a musical figure into a cultural one."

The Beach Boys revisited the Electro-Theremin for two more songs, "Good Vibrations" (1966), an outtake from Pet Sounds that was released as a single, and "Wild Honey", another single that served as the title track of their 1967 album. Tanner was reenlisted for the recording of both tracks.

In 1995, musician Don Was used "I Just Wasn't Made for These Times" as the title of his Brian Wilson-focused documentary, and in turn, the title of the film's soundtrack (also Wilson's second solo album). In the 1990s, Wilson and collaborator Andy Paley recorded a spiritual successor to the song, titled "It's Not Easy Bein' Me". It was unreleased until its inclusion on the soundtrack to the 2021 documentary Brian Wilson: Long Promised Road.

Wilson was asked in a 2011 interview if he still felt that he "wasn't made for these times". He responded, "It was like saying: 'Either I'm too far ahead of my time' or 'I'm not up to my time.' ... [The feeling has] stayed the same ... a little bit, in some ways not ... [Now] I do feel I was made for these times."

In popular culture
 In 2012, the song was used to underscore an LSD sequence in an episode of the television drama Mad Men ("Far Away Places").

Personnel
Per band archivist Craig Slowinski.

The Beach Boys
 Al Jardine – backing vocals
 Bruce Johnston – backing vocals
 Mike Love – backing vocals
 Brian Wilson – lead and backing vocals
 Carl Wilson – backing vocals
 Dennis Wilson – backing vocals

Session musicians

 Chuck Berghofer – upright bass
 Hal Blaine – drums, timpanis
 Glen Campbell – rhythm guitar
 Frank Capp – temple blocks, cup with sticks
 Steve Douglas – clarinet
 Plas Johnson – piccolo
 Bobby Klein – clarinet
 Mike Melvoin – harpsichord
 Jay Migliori – bass clarinet
 Tommy Morgan – bass harmonica
 Barney Kessel – mando-guitar
 Ray Pohlman – bass guitar
 Don Randi – tack piano
 Paul Tanner – Electro-Theremin

Technical staff
 Larry Levine – engineer (track)
 Ralph Valentin – engineer (vocals)

Cover versions

1967 – Carmen McRae, For Once in My Life
1970 – Peggy Lipton
1991 – Louis Philippe, Rainfall
1991 – David Garland, I Guess I Just Wasn't Made for These Times
1998 – Feelds, Smiling Pets
2001 – Aimee Mann and Michael Penn, A Tribute To Brian Wilson
2002 – Sixpence None the Richer, Making God Smile
2002 – Brian Wilson, Pet Sounds Live
2005 – Patrick Wolf, Do It Again: A Tribute To Pet Sounds
2006 – The Servants, Reserved
2012 – Kat Edmonson, Way Down Low.
2012 – Rich Batsford, Mindfulmess
2017 – Jim James

Notes

References

Bibliography

External links
 

1966 songs
The Beach Boys songs
Songs written by Brian Wilson
Songs written by Tony Asher
Song recordings produced by Brian Wilson
Songs about loneliness
Songs about depression
1996 singles
Macaronic songs
Song recordings with Wall of Sound arrangements
Sub Pop singles